Walker D. Russell Sr. (born October 26, 1960) is an American retired professional basketball player. He was a 6'5"  shooting guard born in Pontiac, Michigan.

Russell played collegiately for Oakland Community College, the University of Houston, and Western Michigan University. He was selected with the 9th pick of the fourth round (78th overall) of the 1982 NBA draft by the Detroit Pistons.  He also played for the Atlanta Hawks and the Indiana Pacers.  His stint in the CBA saw him playing for the Detroit Spirits, which later became the Savannah Spirits, and the Kansas City Sizzlers.  Russell also took his talents overseas to the Philippine Basketball Association playing for the Presto Ice Cream Makers and the Purefoods TJ Hotdogs.

Since retiring as a player, Russell has served as an assistant coach for the Toronto Raptors and a player scout for the New York Knicks.

His son, Walker Russell, Jr., played collegiately for Chipola Junior College and Jacksonville State University, and has played professionally in the NBA and the NBA D-League. Both father and son started their NBA career with the Pistons.

Notes

External links
NBA & college stats @ basketballreference.com

1960 births
Living people
African-American basketball players
American expatriate basketball people in Canada
American expatriate basketball people in the Philippines
American men's basketball players
Atlanta Hawks players
Basketball players from Michigan
Detroit Pistons draft picks
Detroit Pistons players
Detroit Spirits players
Great Taste Coffee Makers players
Houston Cougars men's basketball players
Indiana Pacers players
Junior college men's basketball players in the United States
Kansas City Sizzlers players
Magnolia Hotshots players
Oakland Community College alumni
Parade High School All-Americans (boys' basketball)
Philippine Basketball Association imports
Savannah Spirits players
Shooting guards
Sportspeople from Pontiac, Michigan
Toronto Raptors assistant coaches
Western Michigan Broncos men's basketball players
21st-century African-American people
20th-century African-American sportspeople